Lin Qiangbang is a Chinese kickboxer.

As of September 2018 he was ranked #7 Bantamweight in the world by Combat Press.

Championships and awards 

 2018 Kunlun Fight 61.5 kg World Tournament Runner-up

Kickboxing record

|-  style="background:#cfc;"
| 2019-01-26|| Win||align=left| Sattawat || Kunlun Fight City Hero 215 || Xuwen, China || Decision (Unanimous) || 3 || 3:00
|-  style="background:#fbb;"
| 2018-09-09|| Loss ||align=left| Fang Feida || Kunlun Fight 76 || Zhangqiu District, China || Ext.R TKO (Punch) || 4 || 2:19
|-  style="background:#cfc;"
| 2018-06-01|| Win||align=left| Amnat Ruenroeng || Kunlun Fight Macao || Macau, China || Decision (Unanimous) || 3 || 3:00
|-  style="background:#fbb;"
| 2018-05-13|| Loss||align=left| Wang Wenfeng || Kunlun Fight 74 World -61.5 kg Tournament, Final || Jinan, China || Decision (Unanimous) || 3 || 3:00
|-
! style=background:white colspan=9 |
|-  style="background:#cfc;"
| 2018-05-13|| Win||align=left| Jiang Feng || Kunlun Fight 74 World -61.5 kg Tournament, Semi Final || Jinan, China || KO (Punches) || 1 || 1:10
|-  style="background:#cfc;"
| 2018-05-13|| Win||align=left| Taiga || Kunlun Fight 74 World -61.5 kg Tournament, Quarter Final || Jinan, China || Decision (Majority) || 3 || 3:00
|-  style="background:#cfc;"
| 2018-04-15|| Win||align=left|  Vladimir Litkyn || Kunlun Fight 72 || Beijing, China || KO (Punches and Head kicks) || 2 || 0:32
|-  style="background:#fbb;"
| 2017-11-05 || Loss||align=left| Wang Wenfeng || Kunlun Fight 66 - 61.5 kg 8 Man Tournament, Semi Finals || Wuhan, China || Decision || 3 || 3:00
|-  style="background:#cfc;"
| 2017-11-05 || Win||align=left| Joe Gogo || Kunlun Fight 66 - 61.5 kg 8 Man Tournament, Quarter Finals || Wuhan, China || Decision || 3 || 3:00
|-  style="background:#cfc;"
| 2017-07-15 || Win||align=left| Saipetch Ponjaroen || Kunlun Fight 64 || Chongqing, China || Decision (Unanimous)|| 3 || 3:00
|-  style="background:#cfc;"
| 2017-06-10 || Win||align=left| Nobutoshi Kondo || Kunlun Fight 62 || Bangkok, Thailand || Decision || 3 || 3:00
|-  style="background:#fbb;"
| 2017-04-23 || Loss||align=left| Antonio Freitas || Kunlun Fight 60 || Guizhou, China || Decision || 3 || 3:00
|-  style="background:#cfc;"
| 2017-03-25 || Win||align=left| Saipetch Ponjaroen || Kunlun Fight 59 || Sanya, China || Decision (Unanimous)|| 3 || 3:00
|-  style="background:#cfc;"
| 2017-02-26 || Win||align=left| Italo Freitas || Kunlun Fight 57 || Sanya, China || KO (Punch to the Body)|| 3 || 1:08
|-  style="background:#cfc;"
| 2016-12-10 || Win||align=left| Lau Waicheuk || Kunlun Fight 55 || Qingdao, China || TKO || 3 ||
|-  style="background:#cfc;"
| 2016-08-20 || Win||align=left| Hao Jiahao || Kunlun Fight 50 || Jinan, China || Decision || 3 || 3:00
|-  style="background:#cfc;"
| 2016-06-15 || Win||align=left| Lv Junyu || Kunlun Fight 45 || Chengdu, China || Decision (Unanimous)|| 3 || 3:00
|-
| colspan=9 | Legend:

References 

Chinese male kickboxers
Living people
Kunlun Fight kickboxers
Sportspeople from Guangdong
1997 births